is the second studio album of Japanese singer Shiori Niiyama. It was released on 17 June 2015 under Being label. Album includes previous 2 released singles. The album reached #32 rank first week. Album charted for 3 weeks.

Track listing 
All songs were written by Shiori Niiyama

In media 
 Kira Kira was used as insert song for movie Yorisou
 Zettai was used as ending theme for Tokyo Broadcasting System Television program "King's Brunch" (Oujisama no Brunch)
 Wakatteru yo was used as theme song for short movie Yorisou
 Arigatou was used as theme song for Chiba TV program "Music Launcher"

References

2015 albums
Being Inc. albums
Shiori Niiyama albums
Japanese-language albums